Daku Mangal Singh is a Bollywood action movie directed by Chand and starring Dara Singh, Mumtaz and Prithviraj Kapoor. The film was released in 1966 under the banner of Pinky Films.

Plot
Mangal Singh terrorises the Dholakpur village, but he was caught by Bheem. The film revolves around the cat and mouse game of Bheem and Mangal Singh.

Cast 
 Dara Singh as Daku Mangal Singh / Kumar
 Mumtaz as Princess Aruna
 Prithviraj Kapoor
 Bela Bose as Courtesan
 Padma Chavan

Soundtrack

References

External links 
 

1960s Hindi-language films
Films scored by Laxmikant–Pyarelal
1966 films
Indian action drama films